The Carter Road, also known as the Carter Trail or the Carter Military Road, in Utah and Wyoming, was built in 1881 by the U.S. Army. A portion of the trail in Ashley National Forest, running through Uintah County and Daggett County, Utah, was listed on the National Register of Historic Places in 2001.

Other names: Carter Trail; 42UN823 and 42DA208
Historic function: Transportation; Defense; Domestic
Historic subfunction: Road-related; Military Facility; Camp
Criteria: event, information potential

References

National Register of Historic Places in Daggett County, Utah
National Register of Historic Places in Uintah County, Utah
Buildings and structures completed in 1881